Northeast 85th Street is a planned bus rapid transit station in Kirkland, Washington, to be operated by Sound Transit. The station is planned to be located at the intersection of Interstate 405 and Northeast 85th Street near the city center. Its construction will entail the removal of the existing cloverleaf interchange, replacing it with a three-level interchange with separate ramps for buses.

Projected costs of the NE 85th Street station are estimated at up to a third of a billion dollars, making it one of the most expensive BRT projects planned by Sound Transit. The city's existing transit center is located about a mile away and at about 200 feet lower in elevation. A proposal to connect the two stations with a funicular climbing Rose Hill, the first aerial tramway in the Seattle area, was proposed in the late 2010s.

The project was approved by voters in 2016 with the passage of Sound Transit 3 and is fully funded at $250–300 million.  Public meetings for the project kicked off in April 2018. The station is planned to open in 2024 after three years of construction. If accepted, the three-level design incorporating a dogbone interchange under Interstate 405  will be the first of its kind in the United States, and the most expensive bus stop in Sound Transit's bus rapid transit system. Sound Transit estimates that the station could transport a few hundred passengers a day in the 2020s.

A five-building office development for Google is planned to be constructed southeast of the interchange on the current site of a car dealership. An estimated 7,000 employees would work on the campus by 2032.

References

External links
I-405 BRT 85th Street Interchange Project Fact Sheet, Sound Transit official website, dated April 17, 2018

Buildings and structures in Kirkland, Washington
Proposed bus rapid transit in the United States